S. nepalensis may refer to:

 Saropogon nepalensis, a robber fly
 Satoblephara nepalensis, a geometer moth
 Saurauia nepalensis, a Chinese gooseberry
 Saussurea nepalensis, a herbaceous plant
 Schizothorax nepalensis, an Asian fish
 Scirpophaga nepalensis, a grass moth
 Scopula nepalensis, a Nepalese moth
 Scutiger nepalensis, an Asian amphibian
 Skorlagad nepalensis, a ground beetle
 Somatochlora nepalensis, a green dragonfly
 Staphylococcus nepalensis, a Gram-positive bacterium
 Stellaria nepalensis, a flowering plant
 Stenolophus nepalensis, a ground beetle
 Stephostethus nepalensis, a minute brown scavenger beetle
 Styringomyia nepalensis, a crane fly
 Sympycnus nepalensis, a long-legged fly
 Synagelides nepalensis, a jumping spider
 Syntomus nepalensis, a ground beetle